Two Fathers, Two Sons is Russian television sitcom produced by the company Yellow, Black and White. The show is broadcast by the Russian television STS.

Overview 
The series was introduced to the Russian audience in October 2013. The main protagonist of the show is Pavel Gurov, a famous actor who lives in his apartment in Moscow with his son and grandson.

The series has a similar premise to the American sitcom Two and a Half Men.

In the third season, Pavel Gyurov moves to a house in the suburbs, and finds out that he has another son - Dima. In contrast to Vitya, Dima inherited from his fathers qualities of inventiveness and cunning.

Characters 
 Pavel Gurov (Dmitry Nagiev) – Professional actor
 Victor Teterin (Maksim Studentovskii) – Psychologist
 Vladislav (Vlad) Teterin  (Iliya Konyokov) – student, son of Victor and grandson of Pavel
 Anna Teterina (Visvtoria Luchina) - ex-wife of Victor and mother of Vlad

External links

References 

STS (TV channel) original programming
Russian television sitcoms
2013 Russian television series debuts
2010s Russian television series